The Girl in Mourning is a 1964 Spanish comedy film directed by Manuel Summers. It was entered into the 1964 Cannes Film Festival. The film was also selected as the Spanish entry for the Best Foreign Language Film at the 37th Academy Awards, but was not accepted as a nominee.

Cast
 María José Alfonso - Rocío Vázquez Romero
 Alfredo Landa - Rafael Castroviejo
 Pilar Gómez Ferrer - Madre de Rocío
 Vicente Llosa
 José Vicente Cerrudo
 Carmen Santonja
 Doris Kent - (as Doris Ken)
 Mercedes Huete
 Manuel Ayuso
 Manuel Guitián - (as Manuel Guitian)
 Salvador Cortés
 Emilio García Domenech - (as Emilio G. Domenech)
 Diego Rañón
 Francisco Summers
 Pascual Costafreda - (as Pascual de Costafreda)

See also
 List of submissions to the 37th Academy Awards for Best Foreign Language Film
 List of Spanish submissions for the Academy Award for Best Foreign Language Film

References

External links

1964 films
Spanish comedy films
1960s Spanish-language films
1964 comedy films
Films directed by Manuel Summers
1960s Spanish films